Estonian Championships in Athletics is the national championship in athletics, organized by the Estonian Athletic Association. The first competition was held in 1917.

Championships records

Men

References

External links
Estonian Athletic Association homepage

 
Athletics
National athletics competitions
Athletics competitions in Estonia
Recurring sporting events established in 1917
1917 establishments in Estonia